Cama Beach State Park is a public recreation area facing Saratoga Passage on the southwest shore of Camano Island in Island County, Washington. The state park preserves the site of a renovated, modernized 1930s-era auto court and fishing resort.

History
The archaeological record shows that Native Americans were active along the shoreline now known as Cama Beach for thousands of years before the arrival of European settlers. The discovery of human remains and artifacts in the early 21st century threatened to scuttle the creation of a state park at the site. In 1934, LeRoy Stradley opened a fishing resort with some two dozen cabins that could be rented by vacationers at modest cost. After his death four years later, as many other Camano Island resort properties came and went, Stradley's family continued to operate Cama Beach Resort until 1989. Once closed, Stradley's granddaughters sold the resort, which had fallen into disrepair, to the state of Washington at a fraction of its estimated worth, contributing some of their earnings to the property's rehabilitation.

Activities and amenities
Park activities include boating, crabbing, scuba diving, fishing, swimming, hiking on 15 miles of trails, wildlife viewing, and horseshoes. A mile-long trail connects the park with Camano Island State Park. Overnight accommodations at Cama Beach include two bungalows and 24 waterfront cedar cabins. The Center for Wooden Boats operates the historic boathouse and shop, offering boat rentals (including boats from the site's days as a fishing resort), youth and adult sailing and boat building classes, and crabbing gear rentals.

References

External links

Cama Beach Historical State Park Washington State Parks and Recreation Commission 
Cama Beach Historical State Park Map Washington State Parks and Recreation Commission

1934 establishments in Washington (state)
State parks of Washington (state)
Parks in Island County, Washington
Historic districts on the National Register of Historic Places in Washington (state)
National Register of Historic Places in Island County, Washington
Protected areas established in 1994